Stradbroke is a village in Suffolk, England.

Stradbroke may also refer to:
Stradbroke railway station, former station in Suffolk, England
Stradbroke Island, a former sand island near Brisbane, Queensland, Australia
North Stradbroke Island
South Stradbroke Island
Stradbroke Handicap, thoroughbred handicap horse race held at Brisbane

Earl of Stradbroke in the peerage of the United Kingdom